General Forney may refer to:

Edward H. Forney (1909–1965), U.S. Marine Corps brigadier general
James Forney (1844–1921), U.S. Marine Corps brigadier general in the American Civil War
John Horace Forney (1829–1902), Confederate States Army major general
William H. Forney (1823–1894), Confederate States Army brigadier general